QB VII is an American television miniseries produced by Screen Gems; it was also the final program from Columbia Pictures's television division to be made under the Screen Gems banner. It began airing on ABC on April 29, 1974. Adapted to the screen by Edward Anhalt from the 1970 novel QB VII by Leon Uris, it was produced by Douglas S. Cramer and  directed by Tom Gries. The original music was written by Jerry Goldsmith and the cinematography by Paul Beeson and Robert L. Morrison.

The six-and-a-half-hour miniseries won seven Primetime Emmy Awards of the 14 for which it was nominated.

Plot 
Dr. Adam Kelno, a Pole, escapes from a Nazi concentration camp. During his recovery, he romances his nurse, Angela, and eventually marries her and settles in England.

After the end of World War II, the communists try to extradite Kelno for war crimes committed as a doctor working for the Nazis, where he allegedly performed medical experiments on Jewish prisoners. They fail to prove their case and Kelno is vindicated, but afterwards he takes his wife to the Middle East to escape the notoriety.

During World War II, Abraham Cady was wounded, also marrying his nurse, Samantha, though he cheats on her, eventually taking up with Lady Margaret. Initially atheistic, Cady reconnects with his Jewish heritage while in Israel to see his ill father, who dies shortly after his arrival.

Cady writes a book, called The Holocaust, naming Kelno as a Nazi collaborator who performed forced sterilizations on Jewish prisoners. Kelno brings a lawsuit for libel against Cady, which is heard in the London courts.

Kelno insists on his innocence. Cady is defiant when confronted by Kelno and reporters outside the courtroom. Kelno denies in court sterilizing healthy Jews at the behest of the SS, but Cady's barrister presents evidence that Kelno castrated hundreds of healthy Jews as punishments or as medical experiments, and that some of them died as a result.

Kelno is devastated when his son turns on him and throws him out. Cady, too, loses his son, who dies while serving in the Israeli military.

The jury finds in favor of Kelno but only gives him damages in the sum of one half-penny, "the lowest coin in the realm", for damages to Kelno's reputation.

Cast 
 Ben Gazzara as Abraham Cady
 Anthony Hopkins as Dr. Adam Kelno
 Leslie Caron as Angela Kelno
 Lee Remick as Lady Margaret Alexander Wydman (Emmy nominee) 
 Juliet Mills as Samantha Cady (Emmy winner) 
 Dan O'Herlihy as David Shawcross
 Robert Stephens as Robert Highsmith
 Anthony Quayle as Tom Bannister (Emmy winner) 
 Milo O'Shea as Dr. Stanislaus Lotaki
 John Gielgud as Clinton-Meek
 Edith Evans as Dr. Parmentier
 Jack Hawkins as Justice Gilray# (Emmy nominee)
 Judy Carne as Natalie
 Kristoffer Tabori as Ben Cady
 Joseph Wiseman as Morris Cady
 Anthony Andrews as Stephen Kelno
 Signe Hasso as Lena Kronska
 Sam Jaffe as Dr. Mark Tesla
 Alan Napier as Semple
 Julian Glover as Zaminski
 Vladek Sheybal as Egon Sobotnik
 Grégoire Aslan as Sheik Hassan
 Lana Wood as Sue Scanlon
 Michael Gough as Dr. Fletcher
 Leigh Lawson as Dicks
 Geoffrey Keen as Magistrate Griffin
 Robert Hutton as Ambassador Richards
 Clement von Franckenstein as party guest (uncredited) 
#This was Jack Hawkins's final movie role. He had already had a laryngectomy for throat cancer, and used esophageal speech in his speaking parts. He died soon after filming was completed.

DVD releases 
QB VII was released as a Region 1 DVD on May 29, 2001.

See also 
 List of Holocaust films

References

External links 
 

1974 American television series debuts
1974 American television series endings
1970s American television miniseries
Television shows based on American novels
Television series by Sony Pictures Television
Films directed by Tom Gries
Television series by Screen Gems
American Broadcasting Company original programming